Earth Goddess is a ceramic sculpture in St Austell, Cornwall. It was created by ceramicist Sandy Brown. Earth Goddess was unveiled in June 2022 and is the tallest ceramic sculpture in the United Kingdom.

Description
Earth Goddess was created by the English ceramicist Sandy Brown. Earth Goddess is 11.5 meters in height with 6 meter wide arms and stands in a square in the town of St Austell in the English county of Cornwall. It depicts a female figure with outstretched arms decorated with bright 'blobs' of colour. It is formed from five large circles of clay places on top of each other. Each circle is formed of three parts. The BBC News reporter Rebecca Jones described the construction of Earth Goddess as "Technically challenging ... a bit like giant ceramic beads on a metal pole". The creation of Earth Goddess cost £90,000. Upon completion it was the tallest ceramic sculpture in the United Kingdom.

Background
Earth Goddess forms part of the Austell Projects – Whitegold Art Trail of 18 newly commissioned public art works of ceramic sculptures that reflect the historic china clay industry of St Austell. The trail is intended to form part of the economic regeneration of St Austell. The curator of the Austell Projects, Alex Murdin, said that the purpose of the project was to "encouraging people to think differently about their place and see it differently as well".

Brown described her motivation for creating Earth Goddess as wanting the " ... sculpture to make an impact and I wanted her to be female and making an impact". The choice of a female form for the sculpture was due to Brown's perception that there was a lack of large scale female forms in public art and it " ...sort of took me right back actually to my mother – my mother was criticised by her parents for being a girl. They were farmers, they wanted sons. And so my mother was never able to celebrate being female, so I think it's about time that we did."

Reception
The local Member of Parliament, Steve Double, said that 90% of the comments that he had seen and heard about the sculpture were negative. He said that he would not be present at its official unveiling. A St Austell town councillor, Richard Pears, said he liked it and thought that " ... the purpose of art is to provoke, it's to be worthy of talking about. A sculpture that nobody gave a damn about would be a complete waste of everybody's time. I would take a talking point over a boring piece of art any day". A group of local church leaders condemned the sculpture in a letter to St Austell Town Council, describing the statue as “idolatrous” and calling for its renaming or removal.

Brown said that she had not experienced such criticism before and compared the negative reception of the piece to the criticism received by Anthony Gormley's Angel of the North sculpture and works by Barbara Hepworth. Brown said that " ... they were all hugely criticised at the start. It took quite a while. I think that can happen and in time people grow to love it". Brown said of Earth Goddess that "I think she looks amazing, I'm really pleased with her".

References

2022 establishments in England
2022 sculptures
Abstract sculptures in the United Kingdom
Ceramic sculptures
Cornish culture
Outdoor sculptures in England
Sculptures of goddesses
Sculptures of women in the United Kingdom
St Austell
Colossal statues in the United Kingdom